Enemri Najem Al-Marghani (born 1955) is a Libyan long-distance runner. He competed in the marathon at the 1980 Summer Olympics.

References

1955 births
Living people
Athletes (track and field) at the 1980 Summer Olympics
Libyan male long-distance runners
Libyan male marathon runners
Olympic athletes of Libya
Place of birth missing (living people)